Karmasangsthan Bank is a specialised government owned bank in Bangladesh. The bank was founded to finance the unemployed to set up small enterprises. Ansar-VDP Unnayan Bank and the Probashi Kallyan Bank are two specialised banks like the Karmasangsthan Bank in Bangladesh. MD. Nurul Amin is the present chairperson of the Karmasangsthan Bank.

History
The bank was founded in 1998 by the Awami League government, with an approved capital of 3 billion taka. The Karmasangsthan Bank was established as per Karmasangsthan Bank Act No.7 of 1998.  The bank was founded to increase income of people in rural areas of Bangladesh. According to Sahara Khatun the bank was neglected after the Bangladesh Nationalist Party came to power.

Dewan Mujibur Rahman was appointed managing director of Karmasangsthan Bank in September 2004.

In August 2007, Karmasangsthan Bank donated 416 thousand taka to the Chief Adviser's Relief and Welfare Fund.

The highest interest rate charged by the bank in 2010 was 10 per cent.

Maniruzzaman Khandker, tax advisor to Prime Minister Sheikh Hasina and director of Midland Bank Limited, was the managing director of the bank in 2012.

In January 2014, Bangladesh Bank ordered Karmasangsthan Bank to not open new branches and set a series of conditions the bank must meet.

Kaniz Fatema was appointed chairman of the bank in April. Kazi Sanaul Hoq was appointed managing director of Karmasangsthan Bank in August 2019. It provides funding to workers training institutes.

Md Tajul Islam was appointed managing director of Karmasangsthan Bank in January 2020. The government of Bangladesh announced a loan of 20 billion taka to be distributed to Karmasangsthan Bank, Palli Sanchay Bank, Palli Karma Sahayak Foundation, and Probashi Kallyan Bank.

Prime Minister Sheikh Hasina said the bank was providing interest free loans to unemployed youth to start businesses in May 2021. It received part of a 15 billion taka grant from the government of Bangladesh.

Shirin Akhtar was appointed managing director of the bank in January 2022. Md Nurul Amin was appointed chairman of Karmasangsthan Bank in May 2022.

Board of directors

References

External links
 Official Website

Banks of Bangladesh
Banks established in 1998
Bangladeshi companies established in 1998